Ljubomir Jovanović (14 February 1865 – 2 October 1928) was a Serbian politician and historian. He was a professor at the University of Belgrade since its establishment in 1905, a member of the SKU, Minister of Education, Minister of Internal Affairs, and member of the State Council.

Life
Jovanović was born in Kotor, Austria-Hungary (present-day Montenegro). He finished primary and secondary school in Kotor. He was educated at the Grandes écoles, during which he left to participate in the uprising in the Bay of Kotor. He graduated in history at the Faculty of Philosophy. From 1887 to 1901, he was a teacher at secondary schools.
 
He was a librarian and Director of the National Library, then professor at the Grandes écoles University and later when it became the University of Belgrade.

See also
 Jovan Žujović
 Sima Lozanić
 Mihailo Petrović Alas

References

External links

19th-century Serbian historians
20th-century Serbian historians
Serbian politicians
Academic staff of the University of Belgrade
University of Belgrade Faculty of Philosophy alumni
People from the Kingdom of Serbia
People of the Kingdom of Yugoslavia
People from Kotor
People from the Kingdom of Dalmatia
Serbs of Montenegro
Serbian people of Montenegrin descent
1865 births
1928 deaths
Education ministers of Serbia